Myra King Merrick (1825–11 November 1899) was the first female medical doctor in the US state of Ohio.

Early life and education
Merrick was born in 1825 in Hinckley, Leicestershire, England to mother Elizabeth  and Richard King.
She and her parents immigrated to Taunton, Massachusetts where she worked in a cotton mill.
In 1841, Merrick moved to East Liverpool, Ohio.
Merrick attended Central Medical College in Rochester, New York, graduating on May 27,1852.

Cleveland Homeopathic Hospital College for Women
In the 1860s, the Western College of Homeopathic Medicine stopped admitting women students. In response to this, Merrick and C.O. Seaman formed the Cleveland Homeopathic Hospital College for Women.
Merrick became an instructor at this school, which made her "the first woman medical college professor outside of the East Coast". Among her patients was John D. Rockefeller.

References

1825 births
1899 deaths
People from Leicestershire (before 1897)
American physicians
19th-century American women physicians
19th-century American physicians
Physicians from Ohio